Statistics of Kuwaiti Premier League in the 1967–68 season.

Overview
Al Kuwait Kaifan won the championship.

References
RSSSF

Kuwait Premier League seasons
Kuwait
football